Cosmos Hoechst is a German Futsal club from Frankfurt. They currently play in the Futsal-Regionalliga Süd.

Club history 

The club was founded in 2014 and created by former players of Eintracht Frankfurt Futsal to play in the Hessian Futsal League. Cosmos won the league title in their first season and qualified for the highest German futsal league, the Futsal-Regionalliga Süd.

Honours

Hessian Futsal League
 Winners (1): 2015
Hessian Futsal Cup
 Winners (1): 2016

References

External links 
 Hessian Football Association
 Cosmos Hoechst on FuPa.net

Futsal clubs in Germany
Futsal clubs established in 2014
2014 establishments in Germany